= Thenae (Arcadia) =

Thenae or Thenai (Ancient Greek: Θεναί) was a town of ancient Arcadia mentioned by Stephanus of Byzantium.

Its site is unlocated.
